The 1992 season in the first division of Estonian football, named Esiliiga, was the first domestic competition since the Baltic nation gained independence from the Soviet Union in 1991. Eight teams competed in this edition, played in the spring, with Kreenholm Narva winning the title.

Final Round I

Final Round II

See also

1992 in Estonian football
1992 Meistriliiga

References
1992 Estonian season (RSSSF)

Esiliiga seasons
2
Estonia